The 1959 Chicago Cubs season was the 88th season of the Chicago Cubs franchise, the 84th in the National League and the 44th at Wrigley Field. The Cubs tied the Cincinnati Reds for fifth in the National League with a record of 74–80, thirteen games behind the NL and World Series champion Los Angeles Dodgers.

Offseason 
 January 23, 1959: Jim Bolger and John Briggs were traded by the Cubs to the Cleveland Indians for Earl Averill and Morrie Martin.
 March 9, 1959: Chuck Tanner was traded by the Cubs to the Boston Red Sox for Bob Smith.
 Prior to 1959 season: Dick Burwell was signed as an amateur free agent by the Cubs.

Regular season 
Ernie Banks became the first shortstop in the history of the NL to win the MVP award in back to back seasons.

One of baseball history's weirdest plays took place on June 30, 1959, when the St. Louis Cardinals played the Cubs at Wrigley Field. Stan Musial was at the plate facing Bob Anderson with a count of 3–1. Anderson's next pitch was errant, the ball evaded catcher Sammy Taylor and rolled all the way to the backstop. Umpire Vic Delmore called "ball four", but Anderson and Taylor contended that Musial foul tipped the ball. Because the ball was still in play and Delmore was embroiled in an argument with Anderson and Taylor, Musial tried to run for second base. Seeing that Musial was running to second, third baseman Alvin Dark ran to the backstop to retrieve the ball. The ball wound up in the hands of field announcer Pat Pieper, but Dark ended up getting it back anyway. Absentmindedly, however, Delmore pulled out a new baseball and gave it to Taylor. When Anderson noticed that Musial was trying for second, he took the new ball from Sammy Taylor and threw it towards Tony Taylor covering second base, and the ball went over Taylor's head into the outfield. At the same time that Anderson threw the new ball towards second baseman Taylor, Dark threw the original ball to shortstop Ernie Banks. Musial did not see the throw and he was declared out when the tag was made.

Season standings

Record vs. opponents

Notable transactions 
 May 4, 1959: Bob Smith was traded by the Cubs to the Cleveland Indians for Randy Jackson.

Roster

Player stats

Batting

Starters by position 
Note: Pos = Position; G = Games played; AB = At bats; H = Hits; Avg. = Batting average; HR = Home runs; RBI = Runs batted in

Other batters 
Note: G = Games played; AB = At bats; H = Hits; Avg. = Batting average; HR = Home runs; RBI = Runs batted in

Pitching

Starting pitchers 
Note: G = Games pitched; IP = Innings pitched; W = Wins; L = Losses; ERA = Earned run average; SO = Strikeouts

Other pitchers 
Note: G = Games pitched; IP = Innings pitched; W = Wins; L = Losses; ERA = Earned run average; SO = Strikeouts

Relief pitchers 
Note: G = Games pitched; W = Wins; L = Losses; SV = Saves; ERA = Earned run average; SO = Strikeouts

Awards and records 
 Ernie Banks, National League MVP

Farm system 

LEAGUE CHAMPIONS: Morristown

Notes

References 

1959 Chicago Cubs season at Baseball Reference

Chicago Cubs seasons
Chicago Cubs season
1959 in sports in Illinois